Allori is a surname. Notable people with the surname include:

Alessandro Allori (1535–1607), Italian portrait painter
Angelo Allori (1502–1572), Florentine Mannerist painter
Cristofano Allori (1577–1621), Italian portrait painter

Surnames of Italian origin